Yanghwa-dong is a dong, neighbourhood of Yeongdeungpo-gu in Seoul, South Korea. It is a legal dong (법정동 ) managed by its administrative dong (행정동 ), Yangpyeong 2-dong

See also 
Administrative divisions of South Korea

References

External links
Yeongdeungpo-gu official website
Yeongdeungpo-gu map at The Yeongdeungpo-gu official website

Neighbourhoods of Yeongdeungpo District